Tribun Network is a newspaper chain in Indonesia owned by Kompas Gramedia. Currently the group has owned 22 local newspapers, which are spread across 24 cities and regencies in Indonesia, and a national newspaper. Tribun Network also maintain its own news portal Tribunnews.com.

History

In the late 1980s, there was an appeal from Department of Information to the major newspapers for helping minor local newspapers which were hampered by the press permit (SIUPP) problem. The government created regulation to cut advertisement space on a newspaper up to 30% of all content if they didn't want to help minor newspapers.

In 1987, Kompas Gramedia took over the ownership of Sriwijaya Post in Palembang. In the same time, the subsidiary Persda (short for Kelompok Pers Daerah, Regional Press Group) was established under the company name PT Indopersda Primamedia whose initial task was to assist local newspapers that needed assistance. In 1988, Kompas Gramedia took over Mimbar Swadaya weekly newspaper, whose name was changed to Serambi Indonesia in Banda Aceh, as well as the weekly newspaper Surya in Surabaya (which was founded by the Pos Kota in 1986) which was later changed to a daily publication. In 1992, Kompas Gramedia took over the Pos Kupang daily, and in 1994, the Banjarmasin Post.

Persda later strengthened its business by publishing its own regional newspapers in another cities under the Tribun (Tribune) brand. The first newspaper to held the brand Tribun Kaltim was first published in 2003 in Balikpapan; followed by Tribun Timur (Makassar), Tribun Jabar (Bandung), and other Tribun-branded newspapers.

On 22 March 2010, Persda changed its name to Tribun Network, describing the change as "a transformation from a striking regional image to a national one". The unified Tribunnews.com online portal was also launched.

In 2014, Tribun Network published a national-oriented sports newspaper Super Ball as a spin-off for the football section of its newspaper members. Its online portal, which was originally a subdomain of Tribunnews.com, is currently become subdomain of Bolasport.com.

List of newspapers

Tribunnews.com

Tribunnews.com is the online news portal of Tribun Network. All news portals of the chain's newspapers are redirected into subdomains of Tribunnews.com, as well as their e-paper website.

Tribunnews.com was cited by Andalas University in 2018 as the most popular nationally-hosted website in Indonesia, with 183.2 million visits per month. It was ranked at 38 in the world's most popular websites by traffic  by Alexa Internet.  

In January 2019, Tribunnews.com was among the seven Indonesian online media with the highest viewership, and total online media reached 150 million Indonesians, or 56% of the population.

References

External links 
 Tribun Network official website
 Tribun Network joint news portal

Newspapers published in Indonesia
Kompas Gramedia Group
Tribun Network#Tribunnews.com